The 11th Field Artillery Battalion (Indonesian: Batalyon Artileri Medan 11, Yonarmed 11) is a Field artillery battalion of the Indonesian Army. It is part of the 2nd Field Artillery Regiment (Resimen Artileri Medan 2), Kostrad 2nd Infantry Division.

The battalion was established on June 27, 1962, and is located in Magelang, Central Java. It is equipped with the Yugoslavian 76 mm M-48 howitzer.

References 

Battalions of Indonesia
Field artillery units and formations
Indonesian Army
Military units and formations established in 1962